Nadezhda Yefimovna Konyayeva (born October 5, 1931, date of death unknown) was a Soviet athlete who competed mainly in the Javelin. Konyayeva trained at Burevestnik in Kiev. She competed for the USSR in the 1956 Summer Olympics held in Melbourne in the Javelin where she won the bronze medal.

References

 Profile at Sports-Reference.com

1931 births
Year of death missing
Russian female javelin throwers
Soviet female javelin throwers
Burevestnik (sports society) athletes
Olympic bronze medalists for the Soviet Union
Athletes (track and field) at the 1956 Summer Olympics
Olympic athletes of the Soviet Union
European Athletics Championships medalists
Medalists at the 1956 Summer Olympics
Olympic bronze medalists in athletics (track and field)